The Vietnam Veterans Memorial Bridge is a four-lane tied arch bridge in the United States. It carries Interstate 470 over the Ohio River between Bellaire, Ohio and Wheeling, West Virginia.

History
Construction on the tied-arch bridge began in 1975, and was scheduled to be completed by 1981. Frays in the vertical hanger cables delayed the opening of the bridge, which was scheduled to open in July 1981. Additionally, delays in completing Ohio State Route 7 along the western shores of the river and Interstate 470 also resulted in the bridge not fully opening. 

The estimated cost to construct the span was about $54 million.

The opening of the Vietnam Veterans Memorial Bridge, along with another bridge in nearby Moundsville was thought to have reduced the amount of traffic, and thus tolls collected by the nearby Bellaire Bridge by up to 50 percent in 1987.

See also

List of crossings of the Ohio River
Fort Henry Bridge, another tied arch bridge across the Ohio River at Wheeling

References

External links

Vietnam Veterans Memorial Bridge at Bridges & Tunnels

Bridges over the Ohio River
Transportation in Ohio County, West Virginia
Bridges in Belmont County, Ohio
Buildings and structures in Wheeling, West Virginia
Road bridges in Ohio
Road bridges in West Virginia
Bridges on the Interstate Highway System
Interstate 70
Tied arch bridges in the United States
Metal bridges in the United States
Vietnam War monuments and memorials in the United States